James Lee Francisco (October 10, 1937 – September 1, 2018) was an American politician. He served as the 43rd Lieutenant Governor of Kansas from 1991 to 1995. He graduated from Wichita State University and was an employee relations counselor. Francisco lived in Moundridge, Kansas. He also served in the Kansas House of Representatives from 1967 to 1973 and served in the Kansas Senate from 1973 to 1991.

References

1937 births
2018 deaths
Democratic Party members of the Kansas House of Representatives
Lieutenant Governors of Kansas
People from McPherson County, Kansas
People from Lamar, Colorado
Wichita State University alumni
Democratic Party Kansas state senators
20th-century American politicians